Nxuba Local Municipality was an administrative area in the Amatole District of the Eastern Cape in South Africa. The Fish River, as it is now called, was first named Nxuba River by King Sandile in the 18th century After municipal elections on 3 August 2016 it was merged into the larger Raymond Mhlaba Local Municipality.

Main places
The 2001 census divided the municipality into the following main places:

Politics 
The municipal council consisted of eight members elected by mixed-member proportional representation. Four councillors were elected by first-past-the-post voting in four wards, while the remaining four were chosen from party lists so that the total number of party representatives was proportional to the number of votes received. In the election of 18 May 2011 the African National Congress (ANC) won a majority of five seats on the council.
The following table shows the results of the election.

References

External links
 http://www.nxuba.org.za/

Former local municipalities of South Africa